Manasa Veena is a 1984 Indian Telugu-language film, directed by Relangi Narasimha Rao and produced by Rama Arankannal. The film stars Revathi, Rajkumar, Balaji and Sumithra. The film has musical score by M. S. Viswanathan. The movie was dubbed into Malayalam, with the name Thennal Thedunna Poovu.

Cast
Revathi
Rajkumar
Balaji
Sumithra

Soundtrack
The music was composed by M. S. Viswanathan and lyrics were written by Acharya Aatreya.

Telugu

Malayalam

References

External links
 

1984 films
Films scored by M. S. Viswanathan
1980s Telugu-language films
Films directed by Relangi Narasimha Rao